1999 Amateur championship of Ukraine was the eighth amateur championship of Ukraine and the 36th since the establishment of championship among fitness clubs (KFK) in 1964.

Teams

Location map

First stage

Group 1

Group 2

Group 3

Group 4

Final stage
The finals took place in Ovidiopol, Odessa Oblast on October 20–24, 1999.

Post season playoffs

Final game

Third place game

See also
 1999 Ukrainian Amateur Cup

External links
 Information on the competition

Ukrainian Football Amateur League seasons
Amateur
Amateur